Frank Reid may refer to:
Frank R. Reid (1879–1945), Illinois politician
Frank Reid (footballer) (1920–1970), Scottish footballer
Frank H. Reid (1850–1898), American soldier, teacher, city engineer and vigilante
Frank Reid (Canadian football) (born c. 1946), Canadian football player and politician

See also
Francis Reid (1900–1970), British Army officer
Frank Reed (disambiguation)
Frank Reade, fictional character